The Water Source Water Meter Room is a former water meter room in East District, Chiayi City, Taiwan.

History
The Chiayi waterway was constructed between July 1911 and March 1914 as part of the city waterway facilities. The room which houses the metering facility to measure the water flow was built in 1910 as the Water Meter Room. In 1954, water plants around Chiayi County (which then include Chiayi City at that time) were combined into the Chiayi Water Plant, with the exception of Puzi Water Plant. The Water Meter Room was then also renamed as Water Source Water Meter Room. The land where the meter room is located belongs to the forestry industry and due to the lack of access road to the room building, it was covered with plants and trees. However, due to the road widening nearby the structure, the meter room was revealed.

Architecture
The meter room was constructed with Baroque structure with thick pillars and simple gables.

See also
 List of tourist attractions in Taiwan
 Water supply and sanitation in Taiwan

References

1910 establishments in Taiwan
Buildings and structures in Chiayi
East District, Chiayi
Tourist attractions in Chiayi
Water supply infrastructure in Taiwan